Barbara Rittner defeated Elena Makarova in the final, 6–7(6–8), 6–2, 6–3 to win the girls' singles tennis title at the 1991 Wimbledon Championships.

Seeds

  Barbara Rittner (champion)
  Kristin Godridge (semifinals)
 n/a
  Nicole Pratt (third round)
  Chanda Rubin (quarterfinals)
  Pam Nelson (quarterfinals)
  Sarah Bentley (first round)
  Joanne Limmer (third round)
  Catherine Barclay (first round)
  Zdeňka Málková (quarterfinals)
  Ai Sugiyama (third round)
  Anna Smashnova (third round)
  Park Sung-hee (quarterfinals)
  Joannette Kruger (second round)
  María José Gaidano (third round)
  Meike Babel (first round)

Draw

Finals

Top half

Section 1

Section 2

Bottom half

Section 3

Section 4

References

External links

Girls' Singles
Wimbledon Championship by year – Girls' singles